John Barrie (17 May 1925 – 20 June 2015) was a Scottish footballer, who played as a centre forward in the Football League for Tranmere Rovers.

References

External links

Tranmere Rovers F.C. players
Cardiff City F.C. players
Association football forwards
English Football League players
Scottish footballers
Footballers from Hamilton, South Lanarkshire
1925 births
2015 deaths